The Movement of Socialists (PS) is a political party in Serbia. It was founded in 2008 by Aleksandar Vulin, who served as the party's president until 2022, when he was succeeded by Bojan Torbica.

History 
It was founded in 2008 by Aleksandar Vulin, a former high-ranking member of Yugoslav Left. It is a part of the governing coalition with the Serbian Progressive Party (SNS). It was formed by former members of the Socialist Party of Serbia because they disagreed with the pro-European policy of the party; however, it was a member of the pro-European SNS-led coalitions in the 2012 (as part of Let's Get Serbia Moving alliance) and in the 2014 Serbian parliamentary elections.

In December 2022, Vulin resigned as the leader of PS after being appointed as the director of the Security Intelligence Agency.

Political positions 
It is a self-described "leftist" political party, and has been identified to be a part of the leftist camp in Serbian politics. The party claims to maintain a social-democratic ideology, although it is also supportive of social conservatism. It has been also described as left-wing nationalist. Its foreign views are orientated towards Euroscepticism, and have been accused of being anti-Western-orientated. PS is supportive of further cooperation with China and Russia.

It was created as a party vehicle for Vulin, who has been described as a nationalist, and has expressed irredentist views. It has been also described as a satellite party of the ruling Serbian Progressive Party. In an opinion article, Miloš Baković Jadžić, now-leader of the Political Platform Solidarity, criticised PS by describing at as a conservative and neoliberal party "with nothing in common with progressive left-wing politics but its name, symbolism, occasional rhetoric and a somewhat radical program," having engaged in active anti-worker and anti-progressive politics.

Presidents

Electoral performance

Parliamentary elections

Presidential elections

External links 
 Official website (in Serbian)

References 

2008 establishments in Serbia
Anti-Western sentiment
Eurosceptic parties in Serbia
Left-wing nationalist parties
Political parties established in 2008
Social democratic parties in Serbia
Social conservative parties
Syncretic political movements